Coleophora pyrenaica is a moth of the family Coleophoridae. It is found in southern France and on the Iberian Peninsula.

The larvae feed on Thymus vulgaris. They create a trivalved, grey, tubular silken case of 6–7 mm long with a mouth angle of about 25°. The case is covered with detritus.

References

pyrenaica
Moths of Europe
Moths described in 1980